Diogo Abreu (born 4 January 2003) is a Portuguese professional footballer who plays for Sporting CP B.

Club career 
Diogo Abreu made his professional debut for FC Porto B on the 19 September 2021.

References

External links

2003 births
Living people
Portuguese footballers
Portugal youth international footballers
Association football midfielders
People from Paços de Ferreira
FC Porto B players
Liga Portugal 2 players
Sportspeople from Porto District